Zeleni Zub na Planeti Dosade (Green Tooth on the Boredom Planet) is the third album by the Serbian alternative rock band Disciplina Kičme, released by the Serbian record label PGP RTB in 1989.

Track listing 
All tracks written by Koja.

Personnel

The band 
 Koja (Dušan Kojić) — bass, vocals, written by
 Dule (Dušan Dejanović) — drums
 Kuzma (Jurij Novoselić) — saxophone [alt]
 Zerkman (Zoran Erkman) — trumpet

Additional personnel 
 Stanislav Milojković — photography
 Šane (Dušan Petrović) — producer
 Zeleni Zub (Dušan Kojić) — producer
 Vinetu — producer

References 

 EX YU ROCK enciklopedija 1960-2006, Janjatović Petar; 
 Zeleni Zub na Planeti Dosade at Discogs

1990 albums
Serbian-language albums
Disciplina Kičme albums
PGP-RTB albums